
The following is a list of guests of Wait Wait... Don't Tell Me!, NPR's news panel game, during 2013. Job titles reflect the position of individuals at the time of the appearance. All shows, unless otherwise indicated, are hosted by Peter Sagal with announcer/scorekeeper Carl Kassell and are taped at Chicago's Chase Auditorium.

January

February

March

April

May

June

July

August

September

October

November

December

References 

Wait Wait... Don't Tell Me!
Wait Wait Don't Tell Me
Wait Wait Don't Tell Me